Hasan Polatkan (1915 – 16 September 1961) was a Turkish politician and Minister of Labor and Finance, who was executed by hanging after the coup d'état in 1960 along with two other cabinet members.

Early years

He was born 1915 in Eskişehir, Ottoman Empire (now Turkey) to a family of Crimean Tatar descent. He studied political science at Istanbul University. After his graduation in 1936, Polatkan worked at the state-owned Ziraat Bank as inspector.

Political career

He entered politics and was elected in the 1946 general election deputy of Eskişehir into the Turkish Grand National Assembly for the Democratic Party. He secured his seat in the parliament after the 1950, 1954 and 1957 general elections. He served in the cabinet of Prime Minister Adnan Menderes as Minister of Labor and later twice as Minister of Finance ( and ) until the Turkish Armed Forces staged a coup and ousted the 19th government.

Trial and execution

He was arrested with Menderes in Kütahya, charged with corruption and violating the constitution along with some other party members, and arraigned at the Yassıada trials. Polatkan was sentenced to death and hanged on the island of İmralı on 16 September 1961, as were Adnan Menderes and Fatin Rüştü Zorlu. Many years after his death, his grave was moved to a mausoleum in Istanbul on 17 September 1990 along with Menderes' and Zorlu's remains.

He was survived by his wife Mutahhare Polatkan and daughter Nilgün Polatkan.

Legacy

A boulevard in Eskişehir is named after him. His name is given to a high school in Bakırköy, Istanbul, as well as to a secondary school, and a cultural center in Odunpazarı, Eskişehir. The airport in the city of Eskişehir is also named after him.

References
 The Atatürk Institute for Modern Turkish History - Biography of Hasan Polatkan

1915 births
1961 deaths
People from Eskişehir
Turkish people of Crimean Tatar descent
Istanbul University alumni
Democrat Party (Turkey, 1946–1961) politicians
20th-century Turkish politicians
Deputies of Eskişehir
Ministers of Labour and Social Security of Turkey
Ministers of Finance of Turkey
Executed politicians
Executed Turkish people
People executed by Turkey by hanging
20th-century executions by Turkey
People who have received posthumous pardons
Members of the 19th government of Turkey
Members of the 20th government of Turkey
Members of the 21st government of Turkey
Members of the 22nd government of Turkey
Members of the 23rd government of Turkey
Grand Crosses 1st class of the Order of Merit of the Federal Republic of Germany
Politicians arrested in Turkey